Thysanostomatidae is a family of true jellyfish from the Indo-Pacific. The first sighting of Thysanostoma loriferum in Hong Kong; extending its known range from the Philippines, the Malay Archipelago, and Hawaii; was from the Hong Kong Jellyfish Citizen Science project and sightings on iNaturalist.

Genera

According to the World Register of Marine Species, this family includes one genus, Thysanostoma, with three species:
 Thysanostoma flagellatum (Haeckel, 1880)
 Thysanostoma loriferum (Ehrenberg, 1837)
 Thysanostoma thysanura Haeckel, 1880

References

External links

Kolpophorae
Cnidarian genera